Active Citizens Transform was founded in 2004 by Charles Secrett, former Executive Director of the environmental organisation, Friends of the Earth, and Ron Bailey, as a new non-party political movement in the United Kingdom. It aims to mobilise citizens to transform the United Kingdom into a vibrant, participatory and sustainable society. It opposes the "first-past-the-post" electoral system.

ACT published an advertisement in 2005 criticising Labour party members of parliament who promised to support environmental policies but, under pressure from the Labour party's leadership, voted against environmental measures opposed by the British government. The advertisement was criticised by the Advertising Standards Authority for making misleading claims.

One of ACT's main projects was Local Works the successful campaign for the  Sustainable Communities Bill.  ACT inherited this campaign from the New Economics Foundation.

In 2006, ACT formally merged with Charter88, which in turn merged with the New Politics Network in 2007 to form Unlock Democracy.

References

External links 
 ACT
 Charter88
It's No Secrett Any More: Director's Last Day at Friends of the Earth. Friends of the Earth. Press release, 28 March 2003.

British activists
Electoral reform in the United Kingdom
Political advocacy groups in the United Kingdom
Sustainability in the United Kingdom